Ricardo Aranda Cellona, known by his stage name Tom Olivar (born April 26, 1963), is a film and television actor in the Philippines.

Career
He is one of the active character actors in Philippine films and TV series since the 1980s.

He appeared in the classic film Bulaklak Sa City Jail (1984) with a star-studded cast: Nora Aunor, Gina Alajar, Celia Rodriguez, Perla Bautista, Gloria Romero, and Ricky Davao, among others. He garnered a Best Supporting Actor award from the 1984 Metro Manila Film Festival for this movie.

He was cast in several ABS-CBN and GMA-7 teleseryes and melodrama episodes.

One of his memorable appearances was in ABS-CBN's Maalaala Mo Kaya episode Hair Clip, which was aired on March 2, 2013, starring Maricar Reyes, Belle Mariano and Elizabeth Oropesa.

He appeared in more than 70 movies and television shows.

Olivar was a Villain Roles in Action Films Liked Gawa na Ang Bala ay Papatay Sa'yo in (1988), Markang Bungo "The Bobby Ortega Story" (1991), Alyas Pogi 2 (1991), Gobernador (1992), Manong Gang (1992), Hanggang May Buhay (1992), Sala sa Init sala sa Lamig (1993), Ako ang Katarungan The Lt. Napoleon Guevarra story (1993), Mancao (1994), Iligpit na natin si Bobby Ortega Markang Bungo 2 (1995), Batas ko ang Katapat mo! (1995), Ang Titser kong Pogi (1995), Kung Marunong Kang Magdasal Umpisahan mo na! (1996), Minsan ko lang Sasabihin (2000), Kilabot at Kembot (2002), and Walang Iwanan Peksman (2002).

Olivar was another villain Roles in Teleserye appearances in ABS-CBN Sana Bukas pa ang Kahapon (2014) FPJ's Ang Probinsyano (2016) The Better Half (TV series) (2017) La Luna Sangre (2017) and The Promise of Forever (2017).

Filmography

Film
Bulaklak sa City Jail (1984)
Escort Girls (1985)
Ulo ng Gang-Ho (1985)
The Moises Padilla Story: The Missing Chapter (1985)
Napakasakit, Kuya Eddie (1986)
Kapitan Pablo (Cavite's Killing Field) (1986)
Super Islaw and the Flying Kids (1986)
Gabi Na, Kumander (1986)
Anak ng Cabron (1988)
Urban Terrorist (1988)
Gawa Na ang Bala Na Papatay sa Iyo (1988)
Sa Likod ng Kasalanan (1988)
Carnap King? (The Randy Padilla Story) (1989)
Sa Diyos Lang Ako Susuko (1990)
Lumaban Ka Sagot Kita sa Diyos (1990)
Capt. Jaylo: Batas sa Batas (1991)
Alyas Pogi 2 (1991)
Pangako sa 'Yo (1992)
Manong Gang (1992)
Hanggang May Buhay (1992)
Sala sa Init, Sala sa Lamig (1993)Lt. Napoleon Guevarra: Ako ang Katarungan (1993)Walang Matigas Na Pulis sa Matinik Na Misis (1994)Costales (1995)Iligpit na Natin si Bobby Ortega: Markang Bungo 2 (1995)Kristo (1996)SPO4 Santiago: Sharpshooter (1996)Pag-ibig Ko sa Yo'y Totoo (1996)Kung Marunong Kang Magdasal Umpisahan Mo Na! (1996)Ang Probinsyano (1997)Curacha: Ang Babaeng Walang Pahinga (1998)  Higit Pa sa Buhay Ko (1999)Mapagbigay (2000)Minsan Ko Lang Sasabihin (2000)Mila (2001)The Life of Rosa (2001)Kilabot at Kembot (2002)Mama San (2002)Mano Po (2002)Lastikman (2003)Sabel (2004)Aishite Imasu (Mahal Kita) 1941 (2004)Shake, Rattle & Roll 8 (2006)Zsa Zsa Zaturnnah Ze Moveeh (2006)Happy Hearts (2007)Tiyanaks (2007)Bala Bala: Maniwala Ka (2009)Layang Bilanggo (2010)Jack Em Popoy: The Puliscredibles (2018)

TelevisionAgila (1987-1992)Ikaw Lang ang Mamahalin (2001-2002)Marimar (2007 TV series) (2007)Daisy Siete (TV series) (2008)May Bukas Pa (2009)Magkano Ang Iyong Dangal? (2010)Noah (2010-2011)Maalaala Mo Kaya - "Itak" (2011)I Heart You, Pare! (2011)Nasaan Ka Elisa? (2011-2012)Spooky Nights (2011-2012)Maria la del Barrio (2012)Legacy (2012)Walang Hanggan (2012)Maalaala Mo Kaya - "Belo" (2012)Maalaala Mo Kaya - "Gong" (2012)Maalaala Mo Kaya - "Hair Clip II" (2013)Pangako sa 'Yo (2015)Magpahanggang Wakas (2016)FPJ's Ang Probinsyano (2016)Alyas Robin Hood'' (2017)

References

External links

1963 births
Living people
Filipino male film actors
Filipino male television actors